Norrenberger Group is a Nigerian investment banking and asset management firm based in Abuja. Established in 2017, it provides financial advisory services to individual and corporate entities, portfolio management, securities and brokerage. In December 2021, Norrenberger expanded into insurance and pension fund administration with acquisition of International Energy Insurance company (IEI) which was distressed and ran at loss for years on end. Its stock had traded only seven times in four years (2018-2021), unable to pay dividends to shareholders and came under pressure from regulator, National Insurance Commission to recapitalize. International Energy Insurance’s acquisition deal transferred 80 per cent stake held in IEI Anchor Pensions to Norrenberger making it a relatively small pension fund administrator.

Subsidiary

International Energy Insurance Company 
In 2022, Norrenberger Group took over the operations of the International Energy Insurance company (IEI) on approval from the National Insurance Commission.

Awards 

 Most Trusted Finance and Investment Brand Award (2020) by Africa Finance Awards
 The Wealth Product of the Year (2020) by BusinessDay BAFI Awards
 Best Customer Care Award (2021) by West Africa Innovation Awards
 Africa’s Most Outstanding Financial Solutions Group (2021) by African Business Excellence & Leadership Awards
 BBB+ rating (2022) by Agusto & Co

References 

Companies established in 2017